Christian Rivera Hernández (born 9 July 1997) is a Spanish professional footballer who plays as a defensive midfielder for Sporting de Gijón.

Club career 
Born in Gijón, Asturias, Rivera was a Sporting de Gijón youth graduate. In July 2013 he nearly joined Atlético Madrid, but his transfer was blocked by Sporting's board and he was left out of the Juvenil squad; on 2 September of the following year he moved to Real Oviedo instead.

Initially appearing with the B-team in Tercera División, Rivera was called up to the main squad in May 2015. He made his first team debut on the 16th, starting in a 2–3 away loss against Coruxo FC in the Segunda División B championship.

Rivera made his professional debut on 4 October 2015, coming on as a half-time substitute for Diego Aguirre in a 1–1 Segunda División home draw against RCD Mallorca. Thirteen days later he scored his first goal in the category, netting his team's last in a 3–2 home win against AD Alcorcón.

On 1 July 2016, Rivera signed a three-year deal with La Liga side SD Eibar. He made his debut in the category on 19 August, starting in a 1–2 away loss against Deportivo de La Coruña.

On 11 January 2018, Rivera was loaned to FC Barcelona B in the second division until the end of the season, with an option to buy. He moved to fellow second division side UD Las Palmas on 31 July, after agreeing to a four-year deal.

On 25 October 2018, Rivera joined SD Huesca in the main category on loan until the end of the season, replacing injured Luisinho. The following 2 September, after suffering relegation, he moved to CD Leganés also in a temporary deal.

On 31 January 2020, Rivera's loan with Lega was terminated, and he instead joined Girona FC on loan until June. Upon returning, he was assigned to Las Palmas' main squad, but under a layoff; the club later revoked the decision.

On 19 July 2021, Rivera returned to his first club Sporting after signing a four-year contract.

Honours 
Oviedo
 Segunda División B: 2014–15

References

External links 
 
 

1997 births
Living people
Footballers from Gijón
Spanish footballers
Association football midfielders
La Liga players
Segunda División players
Segunda División B players
Tercera División players
Real Oviedo Vetusta players
Real Oviedo players
SD Eibar footballers
FC Barcelona Atlètic players
UD Las Palmas players
SD Huesca footballers
CD Leganés players
Girona FC players
Sporting de Gijón players
Spain youth international footballers